Deidre Ann Hall  (born October 31, 1947) is an American actress. She is best known for her portrayal of Marlena Evans on NBC's daytime drama Days of Our Lives, whom she has played for over 45 years.

Hall has won many awards for her portrayal of Marlena, including two Best Actress Soapy Awards in 1982 and 1983. Hall has won three Soap Opera Digest Awards for Outstanding Lead Actress in 1984, 1985, and 1995.
 Hall was the first recipient of the Outstanding Contribution by an Actress/Actor Award in 1986; in addition to receiving a shared award with Drake Hogestyn in 2005 for Favorite Couple: John and Marlena.
Hall has also been nominated for a Daytime Emmy three times.

Early years
The third of five children born to John and Jeanie Hall, Deidre and her twin sister, Andrea, were born in Milwaukee, Wisconsin, and raised in Lake Worth, Florida along with a brother, John Terry Hall and two other siblings. At age 12, Hall was elected Junior Orange Bowl Queen. She is a graduate of Lake Worth High School, Class of 1965, and studied psychology before sidetracking into acting.

Career
Along with her sister, Andrea, Hall appeared in press materials for the 1952 Hudson Twin-H-Power engine. In her late teens, Hall traveled to Los Angeles for the summer – while attending Palm Beach Junior College – and there she landed some modeling jobs and commercials through an agent. Quickly, she began appearing in television shows, thinking it was temporary until eating a serious career as a psychologist. In a later interview, she recalled that one day, she realized that acting was her serious career.

In 1976, she portrayed the superheroine Electra Woman in Electra Woman and Dyna Girl, a Sid and Marty Krofft live action children's show that aired on Saturday mornings.

Hall appeared on a number of shows, including Emergency! (as Nurse Sally Lewis in the first two seasons), and The Young and the Restless (as Barbara Anderson), before joining Days of Our Lives in 1976 as Dr. Marlena Evans. In an interview, Hall said that she thought that she would have no chance to land the role of Marlena, considering that she was unsure about a career in soap operas, as well as having to compete against established soap opera veterans for the role. Hall was cast, though, and the role skyrocketed her to fame, which was proved by fan protests when a 1979 NBC promo hinted that Hall's character would be killed off. Two separate daytime television magazines named Hall the best soap actress of 1983.

In 1986, Hall began playing Jesse Witherspoon on the family drama Our House, which ran for two seasons on NBC. Wilford Brimley, who was 13 years older than Hall, played her father-in-law in the series; Chad Allen, her son; Shannen Doherty, her older daughter. Hall initially reacted without concern on playing on two television series at a time, explaining that she filmed Our House on weekdays while taping Days of our Lives on Saturdays. However, she left Days of our Lives in 1987 when it became too difficult to co-ordinate her prime time and daytime schedules. Our House was cancelled in 1988, though she did not immediately return to the soap opera.

Hall made guest appearances on a variety of prime time shows until March 1991, when she made a return to Days of our Lives. This decision was a result of a request by producer Ken Corday, who hoped her return would have influence on the low ratings. According to the actress, she was approached to play a new character, but she refused and insisted on portraying Marlena, with a contract for six months only. Producers were reluctant to give into Hall's requests, fearing that the fans would leave after six months when she left. However, she remained on contract with the show for 18 more years until January 24, 2009, when she was terminated because of budget cuts mandated by NBC. Her salary on Days of Our Lives was in the range of $60,000 per month, much higher than most other daytime serial actors. Hall has appeared in more than 3,800 episodes.

In 1995, Hall produced and starred in Never Say Never: The Deidre Hall Story, a made-for-TV movie about her personal struggles to become a mother.  Her longtime Days co-star Suzanne Rogers (Maggie Horton) is featured in the program.

Since at least early 2009, Hall has occasionally guest-hosted Clout, a talk radio program syndicated through Air America Media. In 2010, Hall and her writing partner Lynne Bowman wrote "Deidre Hall's Kitchen Closeup." In 2011, Hall guest-starred on the season finale of Lifetime's Drop Dead Diva. She and Drake Hogestyn reprised their roles as Marlena Evans and John Black on September 26, 2011.

Hall received a star on the Walk of Fame in 2014.

Personal life
She has been married four times:
William Hudson (May 6, 1966 – 1970)
Keith Barbour (1972–1977), a singer
Michael Dubelko (1987–1989), a producer and writer
Steve Sohmer (December 31, 1991 – 2006), an author and screenwriter. Hall and Sohmer have two sons: David Atticus Sohmer (born August 23, 1992) and Tully Chapin Sohmer (born January 19, 1995). Both were born via a surrogate mother known as "Robin B".

In between her marriages to Barbour and Dubelko, Hall dated Louisiana State Senator Ned Randolph in the early 1980s. She made several campaign appearances during Randolph's run for a seat in the United States House of Representatives in 1982, which he lost to incumbent Gillis William Long.
She is close friends with General Hospital's Jane Elliot.

The Hall Family was one of the founding families of the town of Meriden, Connecticut, and Deidre is descended from two notable Halls. John Hall immigrated from England and settled in Boston in 1625. Another ancestor, Lyman Hall, was one of the signers of the Declaration of Independence.

Filmography

Awards and nominations

Daytime Emmy Awards

Soapy Awards

Soap Opera Digest Awards

TV Land Awards

References

External links

 

Living people
American soap opera actresses
American television actresses
American twins
Identical twin actresses
Actresses from Milwaukee
People from Lake Worth Beach, Florida
20th-century American actresses
21st-century American actresses
Palm Beach State College alumni
Year of birth missing (living people)